MediaPortal is an open-source media player and digital video recorder software project, often considered an alternative to Windows Media Center. It provides a 10-foot user interface for performing typical PVR/TiVo functionality, including playing, pausing, and recording live TV; playing DVDs, videos, and music; viewing pictures; and other functions. Plugins allow it to perform additional tasks, such as watching online video, listening to music from online services such as Last.fm, and launching other applications such as games. It interfaces with the hardware commonly found in HTPCs, such as TV tuners, infrared receivers, and LCD displays.

The MediaPortal source code was initially forked from XBMC (now Kodi), though it has been almost completely re-written since then. MediaPortal is designed specifically for Microsoft Windows, unlike most other open-source media center programs such as MythTV and Kodi, which are usually cross-platform.

Features
 DirectX GUI
 Video Hardware Acceleration
 VMR / EVR on Windows Vista / 7
 TV / Radio (DVB-S, DVB-S2, DVB-T, DVB-C, Analog television (Common Interface, DVB radio, DVB EPG, Teletext, etc...)
 IPTV
 Recording, pause and time shifting of TV and Radio broadcasts
 Music player
 Video/DVD player
 Picture player
 Internet Streams
 Integrated Weather Forecasts
 Built-in RSS reader
 Metadata web scraping from TheTVDB and The Movie Database
 Plug ins
 Skins
Graphical User Interfaces

Control
MediaPortal can be controlled by any input device, that is supported by the Windows Operating System.
 PC Remote
 Keyboard / Mouse
 Gamepad
 Kinect
 Wii Remote
 Android / iOS/ WebOS / S60 handset devices

Television
MediaPortal uses its own TV-Server to allow to set up one central server with one or more TV cards. All TV related tasks are handled by the server and streamed over the network to one or more clients. Clients can then install the MediaPortal Client software and use the TV-Server to watch live or recorded TV, schedule recordings, view and search EPG data over the network. Since version 1.0.1, the client plugin of the TV-Server has replaced the default built-in TV Engine.

Even without a network (i.e. a singleseat installation), the TV-Server treats the PC as both the server and the client.

The TV-Server supports watching and recording TV at the same time with only one DVB/ATSC TV Card, on the same transponder (multiplex).
Broadcast Driver Architecture is used to support as many TV cards as possible.
The major brands of cards, like digital-everywhere, Hauppauge, Pinnacle, TechnoTrend and TechniSat, including analog cards, provide BDA drivers for their cards.

Video/DVD player
The video player of MediaPortal is a DirectShow Player, so any codec/filter can be used. MediaPortal uses the codec from LAV Filters by default, but the codec can be changed to all installed ones, such like Ffdshow, PowerDVD, CoreAVC, Nvidia PureVideo etc.
MediaPortal also support video post-processing, with any installed codec.
Due to the DirectShow player implementation, MediaPortal can play all media files that can be played on Windows.

Music player
The default internal music player uses the BASS Engine with the BASS audio library. The alternative player is the internal DirectShow player.
With the BASS Engine MediaPortal supports visualizations from Windows Media Visualizations, Winamp Visualizations including MilkDrop, Sonic and Soundspectrum G-Force.

Picture player/organizer
Digital pictures/photos can be browsed, managed and played as slide shows with background music or radio. The picture player uses different transitions or the Ken Burns effect between each picture.
Exif data are used to rotate the pictures automatically, but the rotation can be done manually too. Zooming of pictures is also possible.

Online videos
OnlineVideos is a plugin for MediaPortal to integrate seamless online video support into MediaPortal.
OnlineVideos supports almost 200 sites/channels in a variety of languages and genres such like YouTube, iTunes Movie Trailers, Discovery Channel etc.

Series
MP-TVSeries is a popular TV Series plug-in for MediaPortal. It focuses on managing the user's TV Series library.
The MP-TVSeries plugin will scan the hard drive (including network and removable drives) for video files, it then analyzes them by their path structures to determine if they are TV Shows. If the file(s) are recognized then the plugin will go online and retrieve information about them. You can then browse, manage and play your episodes from inside MediaPortal in a nice graphical layout.

The information and fan art it retrieves is coming from TheTVDB.com which allows any user to add and update information. The extension will automatically update any information when new episodes/files are added.

Movies
Moving Pictures is a plug-in that focuses on ease of use and flexibility. Point it to your movies collection and Moving Pictures will automatically load media rich details about your movies as quickly as possible with as little user interaction as possible. Once imported you can browse your collection via an easy to use but highly customizable interface.

Ambilight
AtmoLight is a plug-in that makes it possible to use all sorts of Ambilight solutions which currently are:

 AmbiBox
 AtmoOrb
 AtmoWin
 BobLight
 Hue
 Hyperion

It also allows easy expansion for any future Ambilight solutions.

Hardware

Hardware, SD single tuner
For standard definition resolution playback and recording with MPEG-2 video compression using a single TV tuner:
 1.4 GHz Intel Pentium III or equivalent processor
 256 MB (256 MiB) of system RAM

Hardware, HDTV
For HDTV (720p/1080i/1080p) playback/recording, recording from multiple tuners, and playback of MPEG-4 AVC (H.264) video:
 2.8 GHz Intel Pentium 4 or equivalent processor
 512 MB of system RAM

Display and storage, SD and HD
 DirectX 9.0 hardware-accelerated GPU with at least 128MB of video memory
 Graphics chips which support this and are compatible with MediaPortal:
 ATI Radeon series 9600 (or above)
 NVIDIA GeForce 6600 (or above), GeForce FX 5200 (or above) and nForce 6100 series (or above)
 Intel Extreme Graphics 2 (integrated i865G)
 Matrox Parhelia
 SiS Xabre series
 XGI Volari V Series and XP Series
 200 MB free harddisk-drive space for the MediaPortal software
 12 GB or more free harddisk-drive space for Hardware Encoding or Digital TV based TV cards for timeshifting purposes

Operating system and software

Supported operating systems - version 1.7.1
 Windows Media Center Edition 2005 with Service Pack 3
 Windows Vista 32 and 64-bit with Service Pack 2 or later
 Windows 7 32 and 64-bit
 Windows 8 32 and 64-bit (as of v1.3.0)
 Windows 8.1 32 and 64-bit (as of v1.5.0)

As of version 1.7, MediaPortal is not officially supported on Windows XP
It will install, but warn the user of the unsupported status while doing so.

Software prerequisites - version 1.7.1
 Microsoft .NET Framework 4.0 - with the .NET 3.5 features enabled, (as of v1.6.0)
 DirectX 9.0c
 Windows Media Player 11 (Only required on XP SP3, Windows Vista comes with WMP11 and Windows 7 comes with WMP12 already)

See also

 Media PC
 Windows XP Media Center Edition (MCE)
 Windows Media Center Extender
 Windows Media Connect
 Windows Media Player
 XBMC – the GPL open source software that MediaPortal was originally based upon.
 Comparison of PVR software packages
 Microsoft PlaysForSure
 2Wire MediaPortal
 List of codecs
 List of free television software

References

External links
 

2004 software
Free television software
Video recording software
Free video software
Television technology
Television time shifting technology
Software forks
Internet television software
Windows-only free software